Ambaliha is a municipality in Sofia Region, Madagascar.

Ambaliha may also refer to:

Ambaliha, Kandreho a rural municipality in Kandreho District, Madagascar
 Ambaliha (moths), a genus of moths
Ambaliha lactea
Ambaliha lozogramma